Backtrax USA is a weekly two-hour radio program hosted by former WHTZ (Z100) disc jockey Kid Kelly that premiered in 1992. The original show highlights hit music from the 1980s. Since 2003, Backtrax USA has also offered a 1990s version of the show featuring hits from that decade. Affiliate stations may air either version or both. The program is distributed by Westwood One in the United States and by Premiere Radio Networks elsewhere.

History
Backtrax USA premiered in December 1992 with a two-hour block of hit songs from the 1980s. The 1990s edition launched in January 2003. In March 1998, a special version of the show debuted that aired on board United Airlines aircraft and Air Force One. As of 2012, Backtrax USA has aired more than 1,000 episodes.

In January 2018, Backtrax USA hired WASH-FM DJ Toby Knapp as music curator for the 1990s version of the show and substitute host for both the 1980s and 1990s versions. Previously, Knapp and Kid Kelly had worked together at WBHT in Scranton, Pennsylvania in the mid-1990s.

In April 2018, Kid Kelly was inducted into the National Radio Hall of Fame under the category of Music Format On-Air Personality. The selection was based on a vote by the general public, for his work with both Backtrax USA and Sirius XM Hits 1.

For many years, Paul 'Cubby' Bryant served as fill in host. Although the current fill in host is Toby Knapp, substitute hosts have not been utilized since 2020.

References

External links

American music radio programs
Westwood One